Birdbrain is the second album by American alternative rock band Buffalo Tom, released in 1990. J Mascis again assisted with production, alongside Sean Slade. Buffalo Tom singer/guitarist Bill Janovitz said that Mascis's influence probably accented the band's edgier side.

The CD version includes a cover of The Psychedelic Furs' "Heaven," as well as a live acoustic version of "Reason Why," a song from Buffalo Tom's self-titled debut album.

Track listing 
All songs by Buffalo Tom except where noted

 "Birdbrain"
 "Skeleton Key"
 "Caress"
 "Guy Who is Me"
 "Enemy"
 "Crawl"
 "Fortune Teller"
 "Baby"
 "Directive"
 "Bleeding Heart"
 "Heaven (live acoustic)" (Richard Butler, Tim Butler)
 "Reason Why (live acoustic)"

Personnel 
Buffalo Tom
 Bill Janovitz - vocals, guitar
 Chris Colbourn - bass, lead vocal on "Baby", guitar
 Tom Maginnis - drums
with:
 Sean Slade - guitar on "Bleeding Heart", backing vocals on "Crawl"
 Monte Rose - guitar on "Birdbrain"

References

External links 
 Scans of the CD, cover and booklet at discogs.com

Buffalo Tom albums
1990 albums
Albums produced by Sean Slade
Beggars Banquet Records albums
Situation Two albums